Capitola is a small seaside town in Santa Cruz County, California. Capitola is located on the northern shores of Monterey Bay, on the Central Coast of California. The city had a population of 9,938 at the 2020 census. Capitola is a popular tourist destination, owing to its beaches and restaurants.

History  

The original settlement now known as Capitola grew out of what was then called Soquel Landing. Soquel Landing got its name from a wharf located at the mouth of Soquel Creek. This wharf, which dates back to the 1850s, served as an outlet for the produce and lumber grown in the interior. In 1865, Captain John Pope Davenport, a whaleman at Monterey, moved his operations to be near the wharf. Unable to capture any whales, he moved his operations the following year to Point Año Nuevo.

In 1869, Frederick A. Hihn, who owned the property in the vicinity of the wharf, decided to develop it as a seaside resort. At first he leased the area to Samuel A. Hall and the area became known as Camp Capitola. Most authorities believe that it was Hihn who chose the name of Capitola, but they are unsure as to why he did so. Several possibilities have been asserted, one being that it was named for the heroine of The Hidden Hand, a novel by the popular author E. D. E. N. Southworth, favored by Hall's daughter Lulu.  Capitola is known as the oldest beach resort on the West Coast.

In the summer of 1961 hundreds of birds attacked the town. Most of the birds were sooty shearwaters, a normally non-aggressive species that rarely comes to shore. Alfred Hitchcock was a regular visitor to nearby Santa Cruz and read about this episode. He went on to direct a film—The Birds—based on the idea of hundreds of birds attacking humans. The reason for this attack remained unknown for over 25 years until it was discovered that the birds had been affected by domoic acid, a toxin produced by red algae.

The Capitola Classic was a skateboarding event held in Capitola village in the late 1970s and early 1980s. The Capitola Classic was known in skating circles for its annual downhill race, which was a head-to-head speed competition that drew top names in the sport, many local as well as international, including Santa Cruz, California local John Hutson, who held the world speed record for skateboarding at 53.45 mph and dominated the event each year.
Starting in 2009 efforts were made to revive the event.

On March 24, 2011, a drainage pipe burst following heavy rains, sending a surge of water through the historic village area.
Two days later cleanup operations were interrupted when the area was flooded again.

Geography  

Capitola Village is located at the beach by the mouth of Soquel Creek.

Capitola sits on the northeast shore of Monterey Bay. Cliffs mark access to several popular beaches, including New Brighton Beach, or drop directly to the rocky shoreline of the bay. Capitola Village sits in a depression among the cliffs so that the popular tourist and shopping area leads directly to Capitola Beach. Colorful houses and hotels line the slopes of the town leading back up to the clifftops.

The historic Venetian Court sits on the beach just east of the pier and is on the Register of National Historic Places as "The first Condominium Beach Community in the United States, built in 1924".

Climate  

Capitola has mild weather throughout the year, enjoying a Mediterranean climate (Köppen Csb) characterized by cool, wet winters and warm, mostly dry summers. Due to its proximity to Monterey Bay, fog and low overcast are common during the night and morning hours, especially in the summer.

Demographics

2010  

 2010 United States Census reported that Capitola had a population of 9,918. The racial makeup of Capitola was 7,963 (80.3%) White, 123 (1.2%) African American, 59 (0.6%) Native American, 424 (4.3%) Asian, 10 (0.1%) Pacific Islander, 869 (8.8%) from other races, and 470 (4.7%) from two or more races. Hispanic or Latino of any race were 1,957 persons (19.7%).

The Census reported that 9,770 people (98.5% of the population) lived in households, 25 (0.3%) lived in non-institutionalized group quarters, and 123 (1.2%) were institutionalized.

There were 4,626 households, out of which 1,011 (21.9%) had children under the age of 18 living in them, 1,515 (32.7%) were opposite-sex married couples living together, 539 (11.7%) had a female householder with no husband present, 232 (5.0%) had a male householder with no wife present.  There were 339 (7.3%) unmarried opposite-sex partnerships, and 55 (1.2%) same-sex married couples or partnerships. 1,735 households (37.5%) were made up of individuals, and 608 (13.1%) had someone living alone who was 65 years of age or older. The average household size was 2.11.  There were 2,286 families (49.4% of all households); the average family size was 2.78.

The population was spread out, with 1,643 people (16.6%) under the age of 18, 930 people (9.4%) aged 18 to 24, 2,801 people (28.2%) aged 25 to 44, 3,005 people (30.3%) aged 45 to 64, and 1,539 people (15.5%) who were 65 years of age or older.  The median age was 41.9 years. For every 100 females, there were 90.8 males.  For every 100 females age 18 and over, there were 86.4 males.

The homeowner vacancy rate was 2.3%; the rental vacancy rate was 4.8%.  4,430 people (44.7% of the population) lived in owner-occupied housing units and 5,340 people (53.8%) lived in rental housing units.

2000  

 U.S. census, there were 10,033 people, 4,692 households, and 2,280 families residing in the city. The racial makeup of the city was 83.84% White, 1.17% African American, 0.57% Native American, 4.00% Asian, 0.20% Pacific Islander, 5.53% from other races, and 4.69% from two or more races. Hispanic or Latino of any race were 12.63% of the population.

There were 4,692 households, out of which 22.6% had children under the age of 18 living with them, 33.1% were married couples living together, 11.1% had a female householder with no husband present, and 51.4% were non-families. 37.0% of all households were made up of individuals, and 12.7% had someone living alone who was 65 years of age or older.  The average household size was 2.11 and the average family size was 2.79.

In the city, the population was spread out, with 18.4% under the age of 18, 9.3% from 18 to 24, 32.8% from 25 to 44, 25.3% from 45 to 64, and 14.2% who were 65 years of age or older.  The median age was 38 years. For every 100 females, there were 90.5 males.  For every 100 females age 18 and over, there were 87.0 males.

The median income for a household in the city was $46,048, and the median income for a family was $59,473. Males had a median income of $47,879 versus $35,444 for females. The per capita income for the city was $27,609.  About 2.0% of families and 7.0% of the population were below the poverty line, including 5.8% of those under age 18 and 7.9% of those age 65 or over.

Economy  

Capitola Village and Esplanade is the heart of the Capitola Retail and Tourism Hub being a draw for tourist and locals alike with a variety of boutiques and restaurants. Forty-first Avenue is the retail and business corridor for a majority of larger national and regional business serving the community as a whole. The Capitola Mall, the only enclosed regional shopping center in Santa Cruz County is slated for redevelopment into a mixed use project with increasing pressure due to the failure of the traditional mall concept.

Top employers:
According to Capitola's 2018 Comprehensive Annual Financial Report, the principal employers in the city are:

Government

Notable people  

 Harry Hooper (18871974), major-league baseball player, was the postmaster in Capitola for 24 years after he retired from baseball
 Ralph Peduto (1942–2014), actor and playwright
Derek Sherinian (born 1966), rock keyboardist (Alice Cooper, KISS, Dream Theater, Billy Idol), went to Capitola Elementary and Capitola Junior High School. His mother and sister still reside and own a dress store in Capitola Village.
 Skip Spence (1946–1999), the founding member of Moby Grape and former member of The Jefferson Airplane, resided in Capitola during the latter years of his life
 Robert Anton Wilson (1932–2007), author and philosopher

References

External links  

Cities in Santa Cruz County, California
Incorporated cities and towns in California
Populated coastal places in California